Gunji may refer to:

Places
 Gunji, Karnataka, India
 Gunji, Uttarakhand, India

People
Gunji Koizumi (1885–1965), a Japanese master of judo
Riko Gunji (born 2002), Japanese badminton player
Taito Gunji (born 1999), a Japanese kickboxer